Xbox is a video gaming brand created by Microsoft.

Xbox may also refer to:

Game consoles
 Xbox (console), a video game console from Microsoft, which was first released in 2001
 Xbox 360, a 2005 video game console and the Xbox's successor
 Xbox One, a 2013 video game console and the Xbox 360's successor
 Xbox One X, a 2017 video game console, the high-end revision of the Xbox One
 Xbox Series X and Series S, a 2020 video game console line and the Xbox One's successors

See also
 Xbox Game Studios
 Xbox Live, the online gaming service used by the Xbox and Windows PCs and phones
 Xbox Music, a digital music service by Microsoft and successor to Zune
 Xbox Video, a digital video service by Microsoft
 Official Xbox Magazine
 X terminal
The TV Wheel, a TV pilot created by Joel Hodgson that originally went under the title "X-Box"